Berts ytterligare betraktelser  is a diary novel, written by Anders Jacobsson and Sören Olsson and originally published in 1991, it tells the story of Bert Ljung from 1 September to 31 December during the calendar year he turns 13. The book uses the 1989 almanac following the Gregorian Calendar. As standard, Bert opens the chapters with the words "Hej hej hallå dagboken!" and finishes with "Tack och hej – leverpastej". Bert writes diary for each day during this calendar year, and most notes depicts what happened yesterday.

Originally, the Berts betraktelser trilogy appeared in the radio program Almanackan during 1989, where one program was done each day during one year, which Sören thought was fitting well for a diary. During October 1989 Anders and Sören "sprinted" writing the final stories. When reaching the autumn stories, the writers tried to split up the storywriting, calling it "creative competition", trying to exceed each other with fun and surprise with something unexpected.

When the book was released in 1991, it was one of several books by the same writers. 1991 became both the writers' and the book publishing company's best year, saleswise, and the same year the Advent calendar Sunes jul was a TV success. Anders Jacobsson stated in the year 2000 that the book was his favourite Bert book. According to Sören Olsson it shared the first-place together with Berts bokslut.

Book cover
The book cover shows Bert lying on his littered floor writing in his diary while eating popcorn, and listen to radio-tape recorder at high volume. On the floor is a cassette tape, leverpastej, stockings and cards with girls (Ida, Nadja, Paulina and Emilia). A heart symbol appears out of Bert's head, when he watches a photograph (turned to the other side, not revealing who the picture shows). A lamp lights up in the dark, and a dog-shaped telephone is ringing.

Plot
The autumn term of the 7th grade at school has begun. It is September, and Bert's grandmother wants Bert to join the Church of Sweden scouts, as she has found Bert's "weak point": girls. A fire erupts in Lill-Erik's locker at Beckaskolan. As only 7th grader, his locker is in the 9th graders corridor, and now he has to carry the school books in a shopping bag. Åke gathers a group trying to investigate the event. Bert, however, suspects Dödgrävarn, as he also suspects him being together with Paulina, seeing them visiting a cinema together. Bert notices watches in Dödgrävarn's locker, and he watches Dödgrävarn and Paulina. Bert begins to see Paulina as a "traitor", and hopes she gets snuff in her mouth when kissing Dödgrävarn, who uses snuff. In this version, Dödgrävarn is in Bert's parallel class 7 B, and not a 9th grader as in the TV series. It is said that Dödgrävarn broke into a candy store as a 9 years old, and since then it has only become worse. A week in September, it is revealed that Lill-Erik caused the fire. Fearing several 9th graders, he hoped to get a locker in the 7th graders' corridor. Some days later, he gets a locker in the 8th graders' corridor. Bert's interest in Paulina declines by mid-September, in favour of Ida, even if he dislikes Ida smoking. Ida shares locker with Lill-Erik, and even Ida's friend Mona smokes. Mona teases Bert for having glasses. Bert finds a notice at his locker, telling Bert is cute despite having glasses, and invites him to come to the bicycle parking one night. Not knowing who writes the letter, Bert never appears.

By September Bert also depicts the schoolteachers, and ends up in a fight with Jörgen Karlsson in class 7 B at school, as Jörgen calls Bert för "fart" (Swedish: "fjärt", rhymes with Bert) and "flyswatter" as Bert states he has never wounded a single fly. During the music lesson at school, Åke takes the guitar from the music teacher "Peruken" and sings "–Den spanska räven rev en annan röv". ("–The Spanish fox tore another ass".) Åke also expresses Communist opinions. Bert and Åke also hear that in the USA and the USSR, mystic sounds from space have been reported, which might be extraterrestrials.

Early October begins with Bert thinking less on girls, and more on hanging with the other guys. With problems to decide which girl to like, the starts to hang with the other guys in town on Friday and Saturday evening, ending in trouble with raggare. Bert also longs for moped. Åke tries to play the violin in the Heman Hunters, borrowing a violin from a music store. When the sound is bad, Åke attaches wires to the violin, which catches fire. Torleif tells Åke to migrate to Hungary, where the violin is often played.

Some 9th graders, among them Dödgrävarn's friend Karri, are forced to change school after forcing Inez, a girl in class 7 D, into the Beckaskolan basement to show herself naked. The police arrive, taking the 9th graders away from school. Some days earlier, Dödgrävarn has eaten a dinner with Bert at Bert's home.

At school, Åke is often sent into the headmaster (a recurring theme throughout the book). Bert also goes to a cinema with his former girlfriend Nadja, but Bert is not let in, which Nadja is. Bert remains in the foyer, and after hugging, they both go home.

In Björna's recreation room, Bert, Åke and Lill-Erik are to meet three "hot" girls who Björna knows, but the date is cancelled when the girl learns Bert will attend. When Bert calls Nadja, her raggare brothers answer that she is at Paulina and his boyfriend. By October, Paulina has a boyfriend with a doodlebug tractor.

Friday, 27 October. After another fight at school between Dödgrävarn and Jörgen Karlsson, class 7 B has to skip PE and discuss the fighting. Instead, but guys and girls of Bert's class, 7 A, have PE together. During the PE lesson, Bert falls in love with Emilia, a girl in his class who has been there since the 1st grade, but always been in the "background", and who Bert has rarely cared for (except when they were playing table tennis in the third grade, and Bert said sorry for accidentally smashing the ball knocking her dental braces out). Emilia stares at Bert during the PE lesson, and Bert feels like a new person runs around the gymnastics hall, and he thinks of going to Emilia and present himself, but feels it would be stupid as they've been classmates for six and a half years.

Bert also meets Joel, a Christian youth leader riding a motorcycle. Inside a parish hall a group of young people play table tennis. Among them are Emilia, but Bert declines the invitation for swearing when failing to serve the ball.

By November, Bert and Emilia often talk. When Bert returns to school after one week of fever, the guys in Bert's class discover Lisa using a bra, and when Björna calls for the bra being thrown, he is forced to talk to the counselor. During a school canteen food fight, Lill-Erik ("Little Erik") is hit with food by Björna, and becomes "Stor-Erik" ("Erik the Great") and hits Björna, before Ida kisses him on his cheek and he becomes Lill-Erik again. Emilia, who never had been sent out from a lesson or being forced to attend detention before, is sent out from an English lesson by the schoolteacher, Sven "Brallan" Bolund, after declaring for Bert where the schoolteacher tells. Bert feels guilty, and depicts the incident as bigger than a war being fought somewhere in the world, where over 400 people are suspected to have been killed.

As weeks pass, December comes, with Advent, Saint Lucy's Day, Christmas and New Year. While the class celebrates the First of Advent, Bert watches Emilia in the candlelight, while Åke puts fire on his mathematics book protesting against his views on Christmas being "fascist hypocrisy", and he's forced to pay for a new one.

Åke soon says that the Earth is threatened by the "multiastronomiska fulingarna", extraterrestrials from the "inner galaxies" in the middle of the Universe, and they say "–Jolijapa", which he says is either a greeting, or a death threat, and Åke plans making a bomb, stealing chemicals from chemistry at school. Bert continues his contacts with Emilia, at school, at the youth club, and in town where her mother thinks Bert is nice, and greets through her daughter.

When Bert's class selects a girl acting as Saint Lucy, blond-haired Annika wins 29 votes against 1 for not so blond-haired Emilia, who receives a vote from Bert. Bert's class also sings for their schoolteacher, but Åke eats up all 31 saffron buns and everyone tosses snowballs on him. During the 9th graders Saint Lucy possession, Miranda acts Saint Lucy, and the 7th graders whisper "–Tant Miranda" ("–Lady Miranda"). When the Christmas break begins, Emilia wants to meet Bert during the holidays.

Bert's fathers brother, Janne, who lives in New York City in the USA, visits Sweden over the holidays. Janne gives Bert a videocassette recorder for Christmas, while Åke gives Bert a pet turtle who Bert names Ove. Between Christmas and New Year, Ove eats Bert's aquarium fishes. Berts old grandmother on his father's side is to tired to arrive, and sends a letter instead.

Lill-Erik gets a portable audiocassetteplayer for Christmas, which he thinks is waterproof, which it isn't. On 28 December, Bert starts thinking of who he will marry in the future, not thinking it's Rebecka, Nadja, Paulina, Ida, Anki or Mona, he means it will maybe be Emilia. Suddenly he fears the Earth being invaded by small green extraterrestrials from another planet, who would force him to marry a girl of their species instead.

New Year celebrations in Bert's family occur with his 18 years old cousin Sandra, and his  mother's sister Lena and her husband Lars-Olov, who works with computers. Åke's family is also about to have a party, where Åke's father mimics jazz musician Milfred Cherry.

The book ends on 31 December with Bert thinking of calling Emilia and ask a Happy New Year and ask to get together, Probably, he doesn't dare since in the upcoming book Berts bravader, set the following year, Bert and Emilia officially go together by mid-year, after meeting several times before.

Audiobook
Audio recordings were released to four cassette tapes by the Änglatroll label in 1993 entitled "Berts septemberbetraktelser"., "Berts oktoberbetraktelser"., Berts novemberbetraktelser och Berts decemberbetraktelser

Music and songs
The cassette tapes consist of following songs:
September: "Dum i huvet", "Spanska röven", "Riv hela skiten", "Lill-Erik är krasslig" ("Ja till livet")
Oktober: "Jag vill va' en prins", "Kul att få en smäll", "Banan-Boris", "Jag tror hon heter Emilia" (TV-låten)
November: "Negrer är bra", "Inget krångel, mera hångel", "Höst och höst igen", "Heman Hunters"
December: "Jolijaapa", "Hej Lucia", "Nu är det jul", "Milfred Cherrey"

Trivia
In November, when Åke uses graffiti to blame the local ice hockey club for being racists not touching the "black puck", the word Öreskoga is mentioned for first time.
Despite it has passed a while since Bert in Berts dagbok was ashamed at his worst for his name, he lies for Joel telling his name is Sam.
The story with Åke and the violin also appears in the TV series, where it however is Bert who borrows it from the music store to impress on Nadja. Åke later destroys the violin when trying to help his friend.

References 

Berts ytterligare betraktelser, Rabén & Sjögren, 1991

1989 in radio
1991 children's books
Sequel novels
Bert books
Rabén & Sjögren books
1991 Swedish novels